In logic, the formal languages used to create expressions consist of symbols, which can be broadly divided into constants and variables. The constants of a language can further be divided into logical symbols and non-logical symbols (sometimes also called logical and non-logical constants).

The non-logical symbols of a language of first-order logic consist of predicates and individual constants. These include symbols that, in an interpretation, may stand for individual constants, variables, functions, or predicates. A language of first-order logic is a formal language over the alphabet consisting of its non-logical symbols and its logical symbols.  The latter include logical connectives, quantifiers, and variables that stand for statements.

A non-logical symbol only has meaning or semantic content when one is assigned to it by means of an interpretation.  Consequently, a sentence containing a non-logical symbol lacks meaning except under an interpretation, so a sentence is said to be true or false under an interpretation.  These concepts are defined and discussed in the article on first-order logic, and in particular the section on syntax.

The logical constants, by contrast, have the same meaning in all interpretations.  They include the symbols for truth-functional connectives (such as "and", "or", "not", "implies", and logical equivalence) and the symbols for the quantifiers "for all" and "there exists".

The equality symbol is sometimes treated as a non-logical symbol and sometimes treated as a symbol of logic. If it is treated as a logical symbol, then any interpretation will be required to interpret the equality sign using true equality; if interpreted as a non-logical symbol, it may be interpreted by an arbitrary equivalence relation.

Signatures

A signature is a set of non-logical constants together with additional information identifying each symbol as either a constant symbol, or a function symbol of a specific arity n (a natural number), or a relation symbol of a specific arity. The additional information controls how the non-logical symbols can be used to form terms and formulas. For instance if f is a binary function symbol and c is a constant symbol, then f(x, c) is a term, but c(x, f) is not a term. Relation symbols cannot be used in terms, but they can be used to combine one or more (depending on the arity) terms into an atomic formula.

For example a signature could consist of a binary function symbol +, a constant symbol 0, and a binary relation symbol <.

Models

Structures over a signature, also known as models, provide formal semantics to a signature and the first-order language over it.

Every -ary relation symbol is interpreted by an -ary relation on the domain; that is, by a subset of 

An example of a structure over the signature mentioned above is the ordered group of integers. Its domain is the set of integers. The binary function symbol  is interpreted by addition, the constant symbol 0 by the additive identity, and the binary relation symbol < by the relation less than.

Informal semantics
Outside a mathematical context, it is often more appropriate to work with more informal interpretations.

Descriptive signs 
Rudolf Carnap introduced a terminology distinguishing between logical and non-logical symbols (which he called descriptive signs) of  a formal system under a certain type of interpretation, defined by what they describe in the world.

A descriptive sign is defined as any symbol of a formal language which designates things or processes in the world, or properties or relations of things. This is in contrast to logical signs which do not designate any thing in the world of objects. The use of logical signs is determined by the logical rules of the language, whereas meaning is arbitrarily attached to descriptive signs when they are applied to a given domain of individuals.

See also 
 Logical constant

References 

Notes

External links 
 Semantics section in Classical Logic (an entry of Stanford Encyclopedia of Philosophy)

Logic symbols
Formal languages